The 2009 Atlantic Cup, known as the Hotels of Jacksonville Atlantic Cup for sponsorship purposes, was the first Atlantic Cup rugby league football tournament. It was held on November 14, 2009 at Hodges Stadium at the University of North Florida in Jacksonville, Florida. This inaugural contest was a single test between the United States and Jamaica. The event was deemed a success, and sponsors hoped the Atlantic Cup would become an annual event, with other developing rugby league nations such as South Africa and Japan competing. It was followed by the 2010 Atlantic Cup, which featured the United States, Jamaica, and Canada.

Match

Squads

External links 
 https://archive.today/20110713092405/http://www.jaxaxe.com/Home/tabid/129/newsid540/326/Default.aspx
 https://web.archive.org/web/20120223135741/http://www.rlef.eu.com/news.php?id=1146
 https://web.archive.org/web/20110715212911/http://www.rugbyleague.com/rugby-league-news/317

References

2009 in rugby league
2009 in American sports